Zhang Xue (born July 1964) is a Chinese geneticist currently serving as president and deputy party chief of Harbin Medical University.

Biography
Zhang was born in Zhaozhou County, Heilongjiang, in July 1964. He earned a bachelor's degree in clinical medicine in 1986, a master's degree in genetics in 1989, and a doctor's degree in cell biology in 1994, all from China Medical University (PRC). After graduation, he joined the faculty of the university. In 2018, he was appointed president of Harbin Medical University, replacing . Before the appointment, he worked at Peking Union Medical College.

Honours and awards
 1997 The 5th China Youth Science and Technology Award
 2001 National Science Fund for Distinguished Young Scholars
 2011 The 4th Tan Jiazhen Life Science Innovation Award
 2014 State Natural Science Award (Second Class)  
 November 22, 2019 Member of the Chinese Academy of Engineering (CAE)

References

1964 births
Living people
People from Zhaozhou County
Scientists from Heilongjiang
Chinese geneticists
China Medical University (PRC) alumni
Academic staff of Harbin Medical University
Presidents of Harbin Medical University
Members of the Chinese Academy of Engineering